The  (CAO) is an agency of the Cabinet of Japan. It is responsible for handling the day-to-day affairs of the Cabinet. The Cabinet Office is formally headed by the Prime Minister.

Ministers

History
The Cabinet Office was established on 6 January 2001, following the reorganization of the central government. It was created to assist in the planning and overall coordination of government policies led by the Cabinet (including the Cabinet Secretariat). The Cabinet Office is different from other ministries and agencies, as it is installed in the Cabinet and includes several Ministers of State called Minister of State for Special Missions.

Early on, some argued it was inappropriate to use the name Cabinet Office because "it is an organization that divides and manages administrative affairs and not the cabinet itself".

The National Administrative Organization Law does not apply, and all necessary items are stipulated in the Cabinet Office Establishment Law. Since many important policy issues require cross-ministerial responses, many operations have been concentrated since the establishment of the Cabinet Office. Its presence has increased, such as its jurisdiction over certified children's educational institutions. The number of ministers in charge of extraordinary missions has increased from six at the beginning of the Cabinet Office, to nine as of April 2019.

In the Third Abe Cabinet, as a review of the work, the “Act for Partial Revision of the National Administrative Organization Act, etc. for Strengthening Functions Related to Comprehensive Coordination, etc. of the Important Policy of the Cabinet” was enacted, and future work to each ministry Transfer, etc. were established.

Jurisdiction
The Cabinet Office's function is to help the Cabinet work on important policy and streamline critical issues facing Japan into the future. 

Its responsibilities extend to:

The Imperial Family, honorary and official systems
Promotion of the formation of a gender-equal society 
Civil Activities 
Promotion and development of Okinawa and the northern territories
Protection of the public from disasters 
Promotion of fair and free competition between businesses 
Ensuring national security 
Identifying specific individuals in administrative procedures 
Ensuring the proper handling of numbers, etc.
Ensuring appropriate functions of finance 
Promoting measures for the realization of a society where consumers can live in a safe and secure consumer life

As such, the Cabinet Office is responsible for several agencies and internal ministries and administrations through which these responsibilities are spread.

Organization
The CO is structured as of 2014:

Bureaus

General Affairs Division
Human Resources Division
Accounting Division
Planning and coordination Division
Policy Evaluation and Public Relations Division
Public Document Management Division
Government Public Relations Office
Policy Supervisor (Economic and Fiscal Management)
Policy Supervisor (Economic and Social Systems)
Policy Supervisor (Economic and Financial Analysis)
Policy Supervisor (Science, Technology and Innovation)
Policy Supervisor (Disaster Prevention)
Policy Supervisor (Nuclear Disaster Prevention)
Policy Supervisor (Okinawa Policy Officer)
Policy Supervisor (Symbiotic Social Policy)
Awards Office
General Affairs Division
Gender Equality Bureau
General Affairs Division
Research Division
Promotion Division
Okinawa Promotion Bureau
General Affairs Division

Councils
Council on Economic and Fiscal Policy
Council for Science, Technology and Innovation Policy
Council on National Strategic Special Zones
Council for Central Disaster Management
Council for Gender Equality

Committees
Committee on National Space Policy
Committee on Promotion of Utilization of Private Funds
Japan Council for Medical Research and Development
Food Safety Committee
Child and Child Care Council
Council on Dormant Deposit Utilization
Committee on Official Document Management
Committee on Persons with Disabilities
Atomic Energy Commission
Committee on Local System Research
Council on Election System
Council on House of Representatives Election Subdivision
Council on Relocation of the National Diet
Public Interest Certification Committee
Reemployment Monitoring Committee
Retirement Allowance Examination Committee
Consumer Commission
Okinawa Promotion Council
Regulatory Reform Promotion Council
Committee on Tax Investigation

Institutions
Economic and Social Research Institute
State Guest House

Special institutions
Office for Promotion of Regional Revitalization
Secretariat of Intellectual Property Strategy Promotion
National Space Policy Secretariat
Northern Territories Affairs Administration
Administration for Children and Child Care
National Ocean Policy Secretariat
Financial Crisis Response Council
Private Fund Utilization Business Promotion Council
Child and Youth Development Support Promotion Headquarters
Declining Birthrate Society Countermeasures Council
Aging Society Measures Council
Central Traffic Safety Measures Council
Crime Victims Promotion Council
Poverty Countermeasures for Children Council
Consumer Policy Council
International Peace Cooperation Headquarters
Science Council of Japan
Public-Private Human Resources Exchange Centre
Nuclear Power Council

Local branch offices

External offices
National Public Safety Commission
National Police Agency
Consumer Affairs Agency
Financial Services Agency
Fair Trade Commission
Food Safety Commission
Personal Information Protection Commission
Imperial Household Agency

References

External links

 Cabinet Office

 
Government of Japan